Pen Ran, (c. 1944 – c. 1979) also commonly known as Pan Ron in some Romanized sources intended for English-speaking audiences, was a Cambodian singer and songwriter who was at the height of her popularity in the 1960s and early 1970s. Known particularly for her western rock and soul influences, flirtatious dancing, and risque lyrics, Pen Ran has been described by the New York Times as a "worldly, wise-cracking foil" to the more restrained Cambodian pop singers of her era. She disappeared during the Khmer Rouge genocide and her fate is unknown.

Life and career
Very little is known of Pen Ran's personal history. It has been established that she was from Battambang in northwestern Cambodia and attended the same school as the younger Ros Serey Sothea, another popular singer of the same era. Pen Ran had a sister named Pen Ram (sometimes Romanized as Pan Rom) who was also a singer in the later years of the Cambodian psychedelic rock scene.

In the 1960s, Cambodian Head of State Norodom Sihanouk, a musician himself, encouraged the development of popular music in Cambodia. Initially, pop records from France and Latin America were imported into the country and became popular, inspiring a flourishing pop music scene based in Phnom Penh and led by singers like Sinn Sisamouth. Pen Ran was an early entrant in this music scene, with the hit song "Pka Kabas" in 1963, but she became a national star when she began recording with Sinn Sisamouth in 1966. Starting in the late 1960s Ran recorded many collaborations with Sisamouth and other notable Cambodian singers of the period, while continuing her solo career. The debut of the popular Ros Serey Sothea in 1967 had little effect on Pen Ran's career and perhaps even broadened her popularity as the second leading lady of Cambodian popular music.

Style and legacy

Pen Ran was known for her unrestrained personality and western-oriented hairstyles and fashions, rejecting traditional demands on Khmer women and representing new and modern gender roles. Her onstage dancing and flirtatious lyrics were considered scandalous in Cambodia at the time. Translated titles of her songs indicate her risque focus on romance and sexuality (for example, "I'm Unsatisfied" and "I Want to Be Your Lover") and a rejection of traditional courtship (for example, "It's Too Late Old Man"). Near the end of her music career Pen Ran was still an unmarried career woman in her early thirties, which was also unusual for Cambodia at the time. She addressed this topic in the song "I'm 31" which was an answer to Ros Serey Sothea's hit song "I'm 16."

Pen Ran was known to be a very versatile singer, having a repertoire consisting of traditional Cambodian music, rock, twist, cha cha cha, agogo, mambo, madizon, jazz, and folk. When discussing her vocal abilities, one researcher has said "Pan Ron hits notes that shatter glass." Decades later, Nick Hanover described the unique combination of Cambodian and Western influences in the track "Rom Jongvak Twist" as "a Cambodian spin on American dance crazes that sounds less like Chubby Checker than Lydia Lunch." Throughout her career, she is believed to have performed on hundreds of songs, many of which she wrote herself.

Pen Ran disappeared during the Khmer Rouge genocide of the late 1970s and her exact fate is unknown. Her younger sister Pen Ram said that she survived until the Vietnamese invasion of late 1978/early 1979 when the Khmer Rouge launched their final series of mass executions. Given the goal of the Khmer Rouge to remove foreign influences from Cambodian society, Pen Ran's individuality probably ensured her death. In a 2015 BBC documentary on the band Cambodian Space Project, who have covered many of Pen Ran's songs, it was alleged by an interview subject that she was tricked by the Khmer Rouge into performing one of her songs, after which she was led away and executed. 

Starting in the late 1990s, interest in Pan Ron's music was revived by the album Cambodian Rocks and similar CD compilations, while the documentary film Don't Think I've Forgotten described her as one of the most influential artists of her era, as well as one of the most popular artists amongst younger Cambodians.

Discography 
Some of the songs (from the hundreds) that she actually composed and sang herself or with Sinn Sisamouth or Ros Serey Sothea include:

Solo performances

Bondam Tunle Buon Mouk
Bong Kom Pruoy/"Don't Worry Darling"
Chan Penh Boromey
Cherng Mek Por Kmao
Chnam Oun 31
Chongban Kour Sne/"I Want To Be Your Lover"
Chong Nov Ler Mek
Chrolom Pdey Keh
Enjurng Lerng Rom (Cover of Well All Right by Santana)
Giant Woman
JomBang Jet/"Heart in Despair"
Jom Nor Trocheak
Juob Ter Bros Kbot
Kam Peah
Kanya Paet-Sep Kilau/Kanha 80 Kilo
Kdao Tngai Min Smoe Kdao Chit
Ke Kramom Tha Ke Chasa
Kmom Na Min Tech
Komlos Chres Chab
Komlos Lan Krahorm
Konlong Pnhei Khluon
Koun K’Teuy/"Baby Lady Boy"
Memeay Sabay Chet
Mini Samput Khaech/"Mini Skirt"
Memay Bei Dong/"Widowed Thrice"
Meta Oun Pong
Min Jong Skoal Teh Kdey Snaeha
Mjas Chenda
Mtay Kaun
Oh Pleang Euy
Oun Deung/"I Know"
Oun Rongea Dol Ch'eung Knong/"Chills to my Spine"
Oun Skol Chet Bong Srey
Oun Trov Ka Bong/"I Need You"
Pdey Khmeng/"Young Husband"
Phaem Nas Sneha/"Sweet Love"
Pka Kabas
Pka Sondun
Preah Paey Popok
Pros Chang Reiy
Pros Reang Yeh Yeh/Ya Ya Men
Puos Vek Sork Sroka
Reaksmey Preah Sorya
Reatrey Nov Pailin
Rom Ago Ago/Rom Ton Kloun Nov Kmeng
Rom Jongvak Twist
Rom Min Chaet Te
Rom Som Leis Keh
Sabay Avey Mles
Sday Chit Del Sralanh
Sein Kmas Keh
Sneha/Kom Veacha Tha Sneha Knom (Cover of Bang Bang by Nancy Sinatra)
Sneh Krom Mlob Chhrey
Somleng Kmous Kah
Sour Ey Sour Jos
Srolanh Bong Dol Cha-eung
Sromai Jea Nich
Sva Rom Monkiss/"Monkey Dance"
Tom Gomsang Jenda
Tngai Na Bong Tomner
Tngai Nis Min Jol Pteas Te/"Not Going Home Today"
Tgnai Nis Reabka Knyom
Tngai Sonrak
Tonsa Mok Pi Na
Veal Smoa Khiev Kchey
When Will You Be Free
Yulyuom Rhok Sene
Yuop Nih Oun Throv Ka Bong

Duets with Sin Sisamouth and other artists

Somphor Chan Kreufa (Pan Ron & Sisamouth)
Kaal Na Pka Reek
Kuu Nep Nit
Ahnet Oun Phorng Pdei Euy (Pan Ron & Eng Nary)
Bondaet Kbone Laeng (Pan Ron & Sisamouth )
Brorjum Knea Rom Sabay (Pan Ron)
Cer Chaet Chol Chnam (Pan Ron & Sisamouth)
Deing Eiy Teh Bong (Pan Ron & Meas Samon)
Jole Jroke Sin Nean (Pan Ron & Sisamouth)
Kromom Tang Bey (Pan Ron, Ros Sereysothea & Huoy Meas)
Lit Ondat Chea Bakse (Pan Ron & Eng Nary)
PasDai Ban Heiy (Pan Ron & Sisamouth)
Sahao Bomput Dot Manoos Tieng Ruos
Smak Bong Lan Tmey
Smak Oun Mouy (Pan Ron, Sothea & Sisamouth)
Snea Douch Jeung Meik (Pan Ron & Sisamouth)
Soom Gneak Mok Niss (Pan Ron, Sothea & Sisamouth)
Srey Chnas Bros Chnerm (Pan Ron & Sisamouth)
Srey No (Pan Ron & Eng Nary)
Srey Sross Somross Kmean Ptum (1963)
Srorlanh Srey Nas (Pan Ron & In Yeng)
Tgnai Jey Nak Phnom (Pan Ron & Tet Somnang)
Tov Surprise Mdong (Pan Ron & Sereysothea)
Trov Bong Sleak Kbin (Pan Ron & Sisamouth)
Sra Em Phalla (Pan Ron & Sisamouth)
Kamsan Kungkea (Pan Ron & Sisamouth)
Pnhaeu Samnieng (Pan Ron & Kong Phano)

References

External links
 

20th-century Cambodian women singers
People from Battambang province
People executed by the Khmer Rouge
Executed_Cambodian_women
1944 births
1979 deaths